The Roman Catholic Diocese of Franca is a diocese located in the city of Franca in the Ecclesiastical province of Ribeirão Preto in Brazil.

History
 20 February 1971: Established as Diocese of Franca from the Diocese of Rio Preto

Bishops
 Bishops of Franca (Roman rite)
 Diógenes da Silva Matthes (1971.03.11 – 2006.11.29)
 Caetano Ferrari, O.F.M. (2006.11.29 – 2009-04-15), appointed Bishop of Bauru, São Paulo
 Pedro Luiz Stringhini (2009-12-30 - 2012-09-19), appointed Bishop of Mogi das Cruzes, São Paulo
 Paulo Roberto Beloto (2013.10.23 - ...)

Coadjutor bishop
Caetano Ferrari, O.F.M. (2002-2006)

Other priests of this diocese who became bishops
Emílio Pignoli, appointed Bishop of Mogi das Cruzes, São Paulo in 1976
Ângelo Pignoli, appointed Bishop of Quixadá, Ceara in 2007
Pedro Carlos Cipolini (priest here, 1978-1987), appointed Bishop of Amparo, São Paulo in 2010
Devair Araújo da Fonseca, appointed Auxiliary Bishop of São Paulo in 2014

References
 GCatholic.org
 Catholic Hierarchy
  Diocese website (Portuguese)

Roman Catholic dioceses in Brazil
Christian organizations established in 1971
Franca, Roman Catholic Diocese of
Roman Catholic dioceses and prelatures established in the 20th century